Eden Park is a sports ground in central Auckland, the largest city in New Zealand. It has been used for cricket matches since it was opened in 1900 and is also used for rugby union, rugby league and association football matches. The first Test cricket match on the ground was played between New Zealand and England in February 1930. One Day International (ODI) cricket has been played on the ground since 1976 and the first Twenty20 International match was played on the ground in 2005, with Australia the opponents.

In cricket, a five-wicket haul (also known as a "five-for" or "fifer") refers to a bowler taking five or more wickets in a single innings. This is regarded as a notable achievement.

The first bowler to take a five-wicket haul in a Test match at Eden Park was Bill Bowes, who took six wickets for 34 runs for England in 1933.

Key

Test match five-wicket hauls

A total of 59 five-wicket hauls have been taken in Test matches on the ground. Three of these were taken in women's Tests and the remaining 56 in men's matches.

Men's matches

Women's matches

One Day International five-wicket hauls

Nine five-wicket hauls have been taken during ODIs on the ground.

Twenty20 International five-wicket hauls

Three five-wicket hauls have been taken in T20I matches on the ground.

Notes

References

External links
 International five-wicket hauls at Eden Park, CricInfo.

New Zealand cricket lists
Eden Park